Motti Ivanir (born March 18, 1964) represented Israel at national level football player and is currently a manager.

Playing career

Club
Ivanir became the first professional Israeli footballer in the Netherlands when he joined Roda JC in 1986.

International
He made his senior debut for Israel in a January 1986 friendly match against Finland and has earned a total of18 caps, scoring 1 goal. His final international was an April 1992 friendly against Iceland.

Honours

As a Player
Israel State Cup:
Winner (1): 1988
Toto Cup:
Winner (1): 1991–92
Israeli Premier League:
Runner-up (1): 1991-92

As a Manager
Liga Leumit:
Runner-up (1): 2003–04

References

External links

1964 births
Living people
Israeli footballers
Liga Leumit players
Footballers from Tel Aviv
Israel international footballers
Maccabi Tel Aviv F.C. players
Roda JC Kerkrade players
Maccabi Netanya F.C. players
Bnei Yehuda Tel Aviv F.C. players
Hapoel Haifa F.C. players
Hapoel Petah Tikva F.C. players
Maccabi Ironi Ashdod F.C. players
Shimshon Tel Aviv F.C. players
Hapoel Tzafririm Holon F.C. players
Israeli expatriate footballers
Expatriate footballers in the Netherlands
Israeli expatriate sportspeople in the Netherlands
Israeli football managers
Maccabi Netanya F.C. managers
Hapoel Be'er Sheva F.C. managers
Hapoel Ramat Gan F.C. managers
Hakoah Amidar Ramat Gan F.C. managers
Hapoel Nof HaGalil F.C. managers
Maccabi Tel Aviv F.C. managers
Hapoel Ironi Kiryat Shmona F.C. managers
Hapoel Tel Aviv F.C. managers
Maccabi Ahi Nazareth F.C. managers
Hapoel Ashkelon F.C. managers
Israeli Premier League managers
Israeli people of Ukrainian-Jewish descent
Association football midfielders
Israeli Football Hall of Fame inductees